Bolshoye Koltsovo is a rural locality (a village) in Malyshevskoye Rural Settlement, Selivanovsky District, Vladimir Oblast, Russia. The population was 24 as of 2010.

Geography 
Bolshoye Koltsovo is located 15 km south of Krasnaya Gorbatka (the district's administrative centre) by road. Ivankovo is the nearest rural locality.

References 

Rural localities in Selivanovsky District